Couse Creek is a stream in the U.S. state of Washington.

Couse Creek was named for kowish (Anglicized as "couse"), an important food source for local Indians.

See also
List of rivers of Washington

References

Rivers of Asotin County, Washington
Rivers of Washington (state)